João Pedro Lourenço Rodrigues (born 15 November 1994 in Faro) is a Portuguese road racing cyclist who last rode for UCI Continental team .

On 4 October 2022, he received a seven-year ban by UCI for doping.

Major results

2017
 1st  Mountains classification Vuelta a Castilla y León
2018
 7th Overall Volta a Portugal
2019
 1st  Overall Volta ao Alentejo
1st Stage 5 (ITT)
 1st  Overall Volta a Portugal
1st Stages 4 & 10 (ITT)
 4th Clássica da Arrábida
 9th Overall Volta ao Algarve
2020
 7th Overall Volta a Portugal
2021
 1st  Overall Volta ao Algarve
 9th Overall Volta a Portugal

See also
 Doping in sport
 List of doping cases in cycling

References

External links

1994 births
Living people
Portuguese male cyclists
People from Faro, Portugal
Volta a Portugal winners
Sportspeople from Faro District
Doping cases in cycling